The  was an annual dog-sled race held in Alaska during April. Mushers traveled from Nome to Candle, traveling along the Bering Strait, and then return to Nome.

Between 1908 and 1917 the race was held ten times. Due to the United States' involvement in the Great War and new dog-sled races elsewhere in North America, the race was discontinued. Two commemorative events occurred in 1983 and 2008, to mark the 75th and 100th anniversaries of the first race, respectively.

History 

In 1907, the local administrators of the Nome Kennel Club in Nome, Alaska, developed plans for a long-distance dog-sled race that followed a route along the Bering Strait. The first race, named the All Alaska Sweepstakes, took place in the spring of 1908. The competition was held annually until the final race in 1917.

To be in the race, participants were required to register by November. Each team had anywhere from 10 to 20 dogs. The race started in Nome and followed telegraphic lines to Candle, Alaska, before retracing the route to Nome. The telegraphic lines enabled the mushers to communicate their checkpoint times and ranks to the media. The stop numbers and places were uncontrolled, so stewards were placed at each stop along the journey to resupply teams.

Mushers were required to finish the race with as many dogs as they started with, whether they were alive, injured or dead. This rule encouraged participants to take adequate care of their dogs, since an injured or dead dog would be a great drawback. To help minimize the weight on each sled, a minimum amount of items such as clothes, water and shoes for the dogs was loaded.

Winners

Bibliography 
  ;
  ;
 .
 Gold, Men and Dogs by A.A. “Scotty” Allen

References

Dog sledding races
Endurance games
Sports competitions in Alaska